Victor Hugo, born Victor Rojas, (1948–1994) was a Venezuelan-born American artist, window dresser, and partner of the designer Halston.

Early life 
Robb Hernandez wrote in 2019 that Hugo was born at the time of a military coup d'état in Caracas and emigrated with his mother to New York City around 1973.

Halston and Andy Warhol 
Hugo first encountered Halston while working as an escort to make ends meet as a student. Upon their relationship progressing from transactional to romantic, Hugo began doing displays for Halston's Madison Avenue store and later became one of Andy Warhol's assistants at The Factory where among other things he worked on the painter's oxidation paintings. He is said to have been the first window dresser to have incorporated Pop art into his designs. He was also a model for Warhol's "Torso" and "Sex Parts" series. In keeping with his energetic persona, Hugo was quoted in Interview Magazine (April 1975): “Perhaps you would describe me as jaded, darling, but I prefer to say that in living there is absolutely nothing that is bad. I can only say that I live fully 24 hours a day—and I regret nothing". 

When Studio 54 opened in 1977, Halston and Hugo immersed themselves in a hedonistic and partying lifestyle. Cocaine infused orgies were held at Halston's Upper East Side townhome with Warhol photographing the happenings from the sidelines. In his memoir, Bob Colacello described how Warhol often used Hugo to antagonize Halston: “Andy loved it when Victor showed up at [Studio] 54 in a jockstrap or at a Halston party in a Halston dress, in both cases much to Halston’s embarrassment...Victor later told me that Andy actually paid him to do these things”. He further stated that "Andy saw Victor as the perfect source for ideas: someone with a fertile imagination who didn't know what to do with it...The Venezuelan's own art was going nowhere: He signed rat traps and handed them out at parties; he dipped chickens' feet in red paint and called their footprints drawings". In 1978, the artist and videographer Anton Perich made a short film of Hugo destroying a Warhol painting as "a sacrifice".

Later life 
His intermittent relationship with Halston dissipated after about seventeen years. As Miller (2021) described, Hugo's ever-increasing drug addiction and tempestuous nature was a contributing factor to the couple's breakup. Hugo reportedly stole Warhol's works and Elsa Peretti's belongings to feed his drug habit. By 1988, Halston had been diagnosed with HIV and relocated soon after to San Francisco to be closer to his family. Despite their relationship having ended, Halston still continued to pay for Hugo's housing and other expenses. In 1989, Hugo had expressed dissatisfaction with how he was portrayed in The Andy Warhol Diaries—threatening to auction off any Warhol piece in his possession: "I feel like the Central Park jogger...I've been gang-raped and beaten by a dead person and bunch of thugs that work for him. It is the most vile, disgusting piece of pulp literature I have ever read..." Shortly before Halston's death in 1990, a contract was drawn up requiring that Hugo would not contest Halston's will nor cause any embarrassment to the estate. As Stein noted (2021), Hugo had signed a nondisclosure agreement in 1985 to not speak publicly about his relationship with Halston in return for a large monetary sum and some Warhol pieces. Bob Halston locked Hugo out of Halston's New York property after learning that Hugo had moved back in and was taking Halston's personal property.

It was reported in 1993 that Hugo was working on an autobiography, though the project never came to fruition. In his 1997 book The Last Party: Studio 54, Disco and the Culture of the Night, Anthony Haden-Guest wrote how the artist Scott Covert encountered a homeless Hugo in December 1993 sleeping in a park after running out of money to stay at the Hotel Chelsea. Covert and fellow Hotel Chelsea resident Colleen Weinstein helped a cancer-stricken Hugo such as taking him to his hospital visits. When Hugo died in 1994 from AIDS-related complications, Covert and Weinstein did not have the funds to bury him and it took them two weeks to save up enough money. They buried him on Halston's birthday at an East Hampton cemetery.

Legacy 
In September 2007, an exhibition of mannequins dressed by Hugo (from Warhol's collection) was held at the Milk Gallery in New York City. In 2010, Juliana Cairone used Hugo as an inspiration when creating a display to showcase her Halston clothing for sale. Hugo was featured in archive footage about his relationship with the designer in the 2019 documentary film Halston. Among the interviewees was Sassy Johnson, and she gave the following assessment about Halston's relationship with Hugo: "My theory has always been that Halston came from an alcoholic family, that his father had a problem...[and] that Halston recreated his family life with Victor as the dysfunctional person who is constantly going to keep everything off balance". Gian Franco Rodríguez portrays Hugo in the 2021 Ryan Murphy produced Netflix television miniseries Halston. To prepare for the role, Rodriguez conducted extensive research that included consulting with one of Hugo's friends.

References

External links

 
 
20th-century Venezuelan male artists
1942 births
1993 deaths
Gay artists
Window dressers
People associated with The Factory

Venezuelan LGBT artists